Sleep Well Beast is the seventh studio album by the American indie rock band The National, released on September 8, 2017, by 4AD. The album won the Grammy Award for Best Alternative Music Album in 2018.

Promotion
On May 9, and May 10, 2017, the National's Twitter page tweeted out two short audio teasers, one from the title track and the other from the lead single, "The System Only Dreams in Total Darkness".

Singles
The first single from the album, "The System Only Dreams in Total Darkness", was released on May 11, 2017, alongside the album's announcement. The second single, "Guilty Party", was released on June 28, 2017. A third single, "Carin at the Liquor Store", was released on August 8, 2017, followed by the fourth, "Day I Die". on August 29. The fifth single, "I'll Still Destroy You", was released on October 23, 2017.

Packaging and marketing 
The artwork for Sleep Well Beast consists of a black and white photograph, shot by Graham MacIndoe, of the side of a barn in Hudson Valley, New York dating back to the 18th century, bought by the guitarist Aaron Dessner and rebuilt as the album's recording studio. MacIndoe also took numerous photographs of the band during recording sessions for the album inserts. Andrea Trabucco-Campos and Elaynna Blaser-Gould, with partner Luke Hayman, of the British design firm Pentagram, were the art directors for the album's packaging.

Unusually, Pentagram also created the branding and identity for Sleep Well Beast and the band, including a corporate standards manual. Additionally, they created the marketing campaign to highlight and play on the album's themes of politics, society and propaganda as "a bit of a joke". The album and branding use the Grotesque-based font Maison with a predominantly blue and white-based color palette. From the cover, the barn was condensed into a pentagon used as the branding's logo, subdivided into two squares and triangles implemented within the design and branding, even in the artwork itself, as an allusion to corporate branding.

The marketing campaign was executed in several ways. The band's label, 4AD, partnered the design company Diabolical to create a mural for the album in Shoreditch, London, containing a lyric from "Day I Die". Four music videos – "The System Only Dreams in Total Darkness", "Guilty Party", "Carin at the Liquor Store" and "Day I Die" – were directed by Casey Reas prior to the album's release, included in video billboard advertisements released in Times Square, London and Copenhagen. Band merchandise included the branding for the album, specifically the pentagon logo.

Elyanna Blaser-Gould, Luke Hayman and Andrew Trabucco-Campos were nominated for Best Recording Package at the 60th Annual Grammy Awards.

Reception 

Sleep Well Beast received highly positive reviews from music critics. On Metacritic, which assigns an average score out of 100 to reviews and ratings from mainstream music critics, the album received an average score of 85 based on 35 reviews, indicating "universal acclaim".

In The Observer, Kitty Empire described Sleep Well Beast as an exponent of "the tension created by the hyper-musical brother duos, pacing the cage of what 'rock band' means with increased vigour. It often adds up to a subtle, grown-up take that still leaves space for drama."

Accolades

Track listing
All lyrics and melodies written by Matt Berninger and Carin Besser; all music composed by Aaron Dessner and Bryce Dessner; except where noted.

Personnel

The National
 Matt Berninger
 Aaron Dessner
 Bryce Dessner
 Bryan Devendorf
 Scott Devendorf
 Benjamin Lanz – touring musician
 Kyle Resnick – touring musician

Music
 The National – arrangement, performance
 Aaron Dessner – drum programming
 Bryce Dessner – drum programming
 Bryan Devendorf – drum programming
 Maaike van der Linde – additional orchestration 

Additional musicians
 Benjamin Lanz – trombone, synth
 Kyle Resnick – trumpet, flugelhorn, vocals
 Lisa Hannigan – vocals
 Arone Dyer – vocals
 Justin Vernon – synths, vocals
 Andi Toma – keyboards, audio processing
 Jan St. Werner – keyboards, audio processing
 Maaike van der Linde – bass flute, flute
 Romain Bly – horn
 Thomas Bartlett – keyboards
 Jason Treuting – drums, percussion
 Eric Cha-Beach – drums, percussion 
 Nick Lloyd – organ
 Ryan Olson – audio processing
 Erwan Castex – keyboards, electronic percussion
 Alexander Ridha – electronic percussion
 David Chalmin – drum processing
 James McAlister – drum programming
 Josh Kaufman – guitar
 Katia Labèque – piano
 Walter Martin – Vox Continental Organ

Paris orchestral sessions ensemble
 Charlotte Juillard – violin
 Domitille Gilon – violin
 Nikolai Spassov – violin
 Marc Desjardins – violin
 Ariadna Teyssier – violin
 Leslie Boulin Raulet – violin
 Matthias Piccin – violin
 Pauline Hauswirth – violin
 Emilie Duch-Sauzeau – violin
 Sarah Chenaf – viola
 Marine Gandon – viola
 Benachir Boukhatem – viola
 Juliette Salmona – cello
 Barbara Le Liepvre – cello
 Ella Jarrige – cello
 Thomas Garoche – basses
 Grégoire Dubruel – basses
 Louise Lapierre – bassoon
 Emma Landarrabilco – flute
 Bastien Nouri – oboe
 Renaud Guy–Rousseau – clarinet
 Cédric Bonnet – horn

Production
 Aaron Dessner – production; additional recording
 Bryce Dessner – orchestration, co-production 
 Matt Berninger – co-production 
 Peter Katis – additional production ; mixing
 Jonathan Low – recording, additional mixing
 David Chalman – recording 
 Sean O'Brien – recording 
 Jan St. Werner – additional recording
 Andi Toma – additional recording
 Greg Calbi – mastering
 Steve Fallone – co-mastering

Artwork
 Graham MacIndoe – album photography
 Luke Hayman – design
 Andrea Trabucco-Campos – design
 Elaynna Blaser-Gould – design

Charts

Weekly charts

Year-end charts

Certifications

Notes

References

2017 albums
The National (band) albums
4AD albums
Albums produced by Aaron Dessner
Albums produced by Peter Katis
Grammy Award for Best Alternative Music Album
Albums produced by Bryce Dessner